Black Emperor may refer to:
Black Emperor, a villain character from the Viewtiful Joe series
God Speed You! Black Emperor, a Japanese documentary film about motorcyclist group 'the Black Emperors'
Godspeed You! Black Emperor, a Canadian post-rock band named after the above film
Chidi (god) a Chinese deity called the Black Emperor

See also
Black Empire (disambiguation)
Black-chinned emperor tamarin, a New World monkey known for its eminent mustache
Blackspot emperor, a species of emperor fish
The Black Emporium, a vendor in Dragon Age II
Black King (disambiguation)
Black Queen (disambiguation)
Black monarch, a species of bird
Dark Emperor & Other Poems of the Night, a children's poetry book by Joyce Sidman